Kazanka is a rural locality (a selo) in Korochansky District, Belgorod Oblast, Russia. The population was 488 as of 2010. There are 14 streets.

Geography 
Kazanka is located 4 km northeast of Korocha (the district's administrative centre) by road. Bekhteyevka is the nearest rural locality.

References 

Rural localities in Korochansky District